The Liberation Struggle in Kerala (1958–59) was a period of anticommunist protest against the first elected state government in Kerala, India, which was led by E. M. S. Namboodiripad of the Communist Party of India. Organised opposition to the state government was spearheaded by the Syro-Malabar Church, the Nair Service Society and Indian National Congress.The funding of the movement mostly came from outside of India, mobilised by the CIA and international Catholic organisations.  Although termed a "liberation struggle", the campaign was largely peaceful by taking the form of statewide meetings and public demonstrations. Following mass protests in 1959, the Indian government finally bowed to pressure and dismissed Namboodiripad on 31 July 1959.

Background
On 1 November 1956, the state of Kerala was formed by the States Reorganisation Act merging the most of the Malabar District in Madras state, most of the Travancore-Cochin state and the taluk of Kasargod, South Kanara. In 1957, the first elections for the new Kerala Legislative Assembly were held, and a Communist Party of India-led government came to power, under E. M. S. Namboodiripad. 

Source: Kerala Government

Education Bill, 1957 
Source: Government of Kerala

The Education Bill, 1957 was introduced in Assembly by Minister for Education Joseph Mundassery. The bill sought to regulate the Government Grant Aided educational institutions in Kerala. The bill was introduced in July, 1957, passed in September, 1957, later returned by the President for reconsideration, reconsidered and passed again in November 1958 and was made law from January, 1959.

It primarily attempted,

 To set standard norms for teacher recruitments in Grant Aided institutions.
 To grant the right to approve minimum teacher qualifications to the state.
 Managements would hereafter be able to appoint teachers only from a government list.
 Teacher appointments would be made on communal rotation.
 To prescribe salaries for teachers (teachers were to be directly paid from the state treasury) 
 To curb powers of the managements to dismiss teachers at will.
 To gave the state the authority to appropriate institutions that did not act in accordance with the bill.

Agrarian Relations Bill, 1957 
Source: Government of Kerala   Agrarian Relations Bill

Agrarian Relations Bill, 1957 was introduced by Minister for Land Revenue K. R. Gowri in the Kerala Assembly (introduced in December, 1957 and passed in June, 1959).

It primarily attempted,

 To provide security of tenure to the cultivating peasants (tenants).
 Gave tenants the 'right' to buy 'their' land from the landlord.
 To crackdown on the eviction powers of landlords (as a security to the hut dwellers).
 All evictions made illegal (after the formation of Kerala).
 To establish procedures for determining a fair rent and waive arrears. 
 To fix a ceiling on the amount of land a family could own (15 acres of double-crop paddy land for a family of five).
 The state would acquire excess land with a compensation to the original owner.
 Redistribute the excess land thus collected. 
 To establish Land Tribunals in every taluk of Kerala.

Interest groups
However, some clauses in the new bills became controversial as those clauses offended several influential interest groups, such as the Catholic Church of Kerala, Muslim League and the NSS.
Political parties: Besides the socio-religious organizations, all the major opposition parties including Indian National Congress, Praja Socialist Party (PSP), Muslim League, Revolutionary Socialist Party, and Kerala Socialist Party rallied together demanding the dismissal of the EMS ministry. They formed a joint steering committee with R. Sankar as the president and P. T. Chacko, Pullolil, Kumbalathu Sanku Pillai, Mathai Manjooran, Fr. Joseph Vadakkan, B. Wellington, N. Sreekantan Nair, C. H. Muhammed Koya, and Bafaqi Thangal among its members.
Syrian Christians: A significant proportion of the schools in Kerala were owned by Syrian Christian churches. They found many reformist policies of government as infringements over their rights and so used newspapers and other publications, such as Deepika and Malayala Manorama, to propagate panicking messages against the controversial policies. Christians used their political influence in the central government to derail the educational reforms. The Education Bill was referred to the Supreme court by the President of India and on 17 May 1958 the Supreme Court reported that some clauses of the bill infringed the constitutional rights of minorities. However, the government got presidential assent on 19 February 1959 after it had revised the bill. The disagreement widened, and the Church representatives sought the help of the NSS to fight the government. Following the Angamaly police firing (13 June 1959) in which seven of its members were killed, the Catholic Church and other Syrian Christian Churches actively participated in the struggle and mobilised massive support.
Nair Service Society: NSS, a community welfare organization of Nairs, was a major opponent of land reform policies of the government, which they considered as radical and ill-disposed towards the Nair community of Kerala. In December 1958, NSS joined up with the Catholic Church to form an anticommunist front. The government retracted partially on sensing the trouble that could be created by the alliance of NSS and the Syrian Christians, and it indicated its readiness to make concessions. However, the founder and leader of the NSS, Mannathu Padmanabhan, declared that "the aim is not limited to the redressal of specific issues but extended to the removal of the Communist Party". He called on all the field units of the NSS to organise the people and on the educational institutions to close them.
Central Intelligence Agency (CIA): Communists allege that the CIA was behind the liberation struggle. The role of the CIA in the struggle is depicted in the work of Daniel Patrick Moynihan, the American ambassador to India (1973–75) in his 1978 book: "A Dangerous Place". His statements are corroborated by Howard Schaffer, the biographer of Ellsworth Bunker, the American ambassador to India (1956–61), who is quoted confirming American and his involvement in funding the agitation against EMS's communist government to prevent "additional Keralas".

Agitations and reprisals
A revolt against the Communist government's educational policies took shape. At Angamaly, the prime centre of Christians,, the intensity of fury broke into open violence.  The Communist Party government's claim was that the police were forced to open fire on what they claim was a violent mob, who allegedly attempted to attack a police station. The police firing and killing of 7 people is said to have instigated a mass movement against the EMS Government.

Rallies and demonstrations against the government took place throughout the state. The protests were spearheaded by the Indian National Congress, the then ruling party of Government of India (Union Government) and were later supported by various religious and communal groups. The communists strongly believed that the Central Intelligence Agency discreetly supported these protests, financially and otherwise. The death of a pregnant fisher woman, named Flory, a Christian woman in the police firing aggravated the situation.

One notable feature of the movement was the participation of school and college students supporting the movement; the Kerala Students Union, the student wing of the Indian National Congress also played a role.

Results

 The Union Government dismissed the Kerala Ministry on 31 July 1959, and imposed President's Rule (31 July 1959  - 22 February 1960). In the 1960 Assembly Elections, the Indian National Congress led-coalition won a majority of seats (Congress with 63 seats); the Communist Party of India, only 29 seats.
 The new Government of Kerala replaced the controversial provisions of the Education Act (the Grant Aided institution managers regained the authority to appoint teachers). The Agrarian Relations Act, sent back by the President for reconsideration and later amended and passed by the Kerala Assemby (October, 1960), was declared unconstitutional by the High Court. The Assembly later passed the mellowed Kerala Land Reforms Act of 1963 (came into force in 1964).

External links 
 A red dawn that set too soon

References 

Political history of Kerala
History of Kerala (1947–present)
Anti-communism in India
Social history of Kerala